Għar il-Kbir (English: Literally: "The big cave") is a complex of caves in Dingli, Malta. It is mostly known for several curt ruts which are located next to it. It is also commonly believed that several families of troglodytes inhabited the cave until 1835. The general structure of the cave system has eight caves spread across two levels.

References 

Caves of Malta
Archeological sites in Malta